The 2011 Nordic Figure Skating Championships were held from February 10 to 13, 2011 at the Rødovre Skøjte Arena in Rødovre, Denmark. Skaters competed in the disciplines of men's singles and ladies' singles on the senior, junior, and novice levels.

Eligibility
The senior-level competition was open to all ISU member nations. The junior and novice level competitions was open to skaters from Denmark, Iceland, Norway, Sweden, and Finland.

Competitors

Senior

Schedule

Senior results

Men

Ladies

External links
 official site
 results

Nordic Figure Skating Championships, 2011
Nordic Figure Skating Championships
International figure skating competitions hosted by Denmark
Nordic Figure Skating Championships, 2011